The North Island kōkako (Callaeas wilsoni) is an endangered forest bird which is endemic to the North Island of New Zealand. It is grey in colour, with a small black mask. It has blue wattles (although this colour develops with age: in the young of this bird they are actually coloured a light pink). Because of its wattle, the bird is sometimes locally called the blue-wattled crow, although it is not a corvid.

Threats and conservation

In the early 1900s the North Island kōkako was common in forests throughout the North Island and its offshore islands. Primary causes of kōkako decline were forest clearance by settlers and the introduction of predators such as rats, stoats and possums.

Unlike many of New Zealand's most vulnerable birds, kōkako survive in low numbers in several North Island native forests. However, research has shown that female kōkako are particularly at risk of predation as they carry out all incubation and brooding throughout a prolonged (50-day) nesting period. Years of such predation have resulted in populations that are predominantly male and with consequent low productivity rates.

Government-funded pest control programmes, and captive breeding programmes are critical to helping maintain population numbers on the mainland. A "research by management" approach has demonstrated that the kōkako decline can be reversed and populations maintained in mainland forests by innovative management of their habitat. Current research aims to increase management efficiency to ensure long-term kōkako survival. The use of biodegradable 1080 poison has been particularly beneficial in reversing population decline. For example, between 1991 and 1999 the breeding population of kōkako increased tenfold in Mapara Wildlife Reserve (Waikato) thanks to a series of four aerial 1080 operations. A population of kōkako has also been re-established at the Otanewainuku Forest in the Bay of Plenty.

New populations are also being established through releases on predator-free offshore islands. As a result, conservationists are hopeful of the species' long-term survival.

Distribution

As of 2010, North Island kōkako were present in Pureora Forest Park, Whirinaki Te Pua-a-Tāne Conservation Park, Mapara Wildlife Reserve, the Hunua Ranges, Ngapukeriki, Kaharoa Forest, the Te Urewera National Park, Puketi Forest, the Waitākere Ranges and the Waima/Waipoua Forests of Northland. Kōkako can be seen relatively easily on a number of publicly accessible offshore island sanctuaries, including Tiritiri Matangi and Kapiti Island where the regenerating forest is low enough to provide close views. A captive bird can be seen at Pukaha / Mount Bruce National Wildlife Centre.

References

External links

North Island kōkako
Birds of the North Island
North Island kōkako
North Island kōkako
Endemic birds of New Zealand